Minnesota State University, Mankato (MNSU, MSU, or Minnesota State) is a public university in Mankato, Minnesota, United States. It is Minnesota's second-largest university and has over 145,000 living alumni worldwide. Founded in 1868, it is the second-oldest member of the Minnesota State Colleges and Universities system and is commonly referred to as the flagship institution. It was established as the Second State Normal School in 1858 and officially opened as Mankato Normal School a decade later. Minnesota State University, Mankato is a significant contributor to the local and state economies, adding $827 million annually.

Across seven colleges and schools, Minnesota State offers over 130 undergraduate programs of study, over 80 master's programs, and 4 doctoral programs. It hosts the only nationally, regionally, and state accredited aviation program in Minnesota. Students are served by 750 full-time faculty members, creating a 21:1 student to faculty ratio.

In addition to the main campus, MNSU operates two satellite campuses: one in the Twin Cities suburb Edina and the other in Owatonna. Through the College of Extended Learning, it provides bachelor's degrees online and at the Normandale Partnership Center in Bloomington. In 2023, MNSU partnered with Saint Paul College to launch the Minnesota Polytechnic and Applied Learning Institute (MinnPoly), becoming the first polytechnic institute of Minnesota.

The Minnesota State Mavericks compete in 21 intercollegiate sports, most at the NCAA Division II level in the Northern Sun Intercollegiate Conference. Its men's and women's ice hockey teams compete at the Division I level, respectively in the Central Collegiate Hockey Association (CCHA) and Western Collegiate Hockey Association (WCHA).

History

1860–1921: Founding and early years 
The State Legislature recognized the need for an education center in southern Minnesota by 1858. In 1860 the legislature chartered the development of state run normal schools to serve areas outside of Winona. The largest and fastest growing cities outside of Saint Paul, Saint Cloud and Mankato were selected for the sites dependent on local fundraising to establish the schools with seed money. Through the efforts of local attorney turned state legislator Daniel Buck, the newly formed City of Mankato donated $5,000 raised from the area community and sold $5,000 in bonds for the founding of the second state normal school, Mankato Normal School. Chartered in state law in 1860, the first classes were held in 1868 with an enrollment of 27 students. The institution's original mission was to train and educate teachers for rural schools throughout southern Minnesota. Early course work included sciences, mathematics, civil engineering, agriculture, western classics, and basic pedagogy. The cornerstone of the first Normal School-owned building was laid on June 22, 1869. George M. Gage served as the first principal of Mankato Normal School from 1868 to 1872.

During this early period, Mankato Normal School provided educational certificates that allowed for graduates to become school teachers and a majority of the students were women. In relation to this focus on women's education, Mankato Normal School is noted as the first public college in the United States to be headed by a woman, suffragette Julia Sears, in 1872. In 1873, Sears was demoted by the State Normal Board to assistant principal and was replaced as principal by Rev. David C. John. Sears' salary as assistant principal was reduced from $1,500 to $1,200 and resulted in a letter to Gage that it was doubtful that she would see him again in Minnesota. In response, the position as assistant principal was offered to Cornelius Hyde. Both Sears and Hyde arrived for work on September 1, 1873.

After it was determined that Hyde would receive the position, 41 students refused to attend classes and 32 were expelled for failing to return after 3 days. 60 residents signed a petition requesting that Hyde return to his position as instructor and that Sears would be reinstated as assistant principal. This became known as the "Sears Rebellion", which lasted until Sears left the school for a professorship at Peabody Normal School. These events would later come to be remembered as a new residence hall was dedicated in honor of Sears in 2008 and a commission on the status of women was founded to support the advancement of women's education at the institution in the 1990s.

1921–1957: Teaching college, post-WWII expansion 

By 1921, the school had grown significantly to the point that it began to offer four-year bachelor's degrees. As a result, it was renamed the Mankato State Teachers College. The original Old Main building was destroyed in a fire in 1922 and a new building was completed on April 4, 1924. Enrollment then dipped during World War II and the college refocused its extension programs on providing education to members of the Works Progress Administration and Naval Corps.

During the post-World War II period, student enrollment expanded greatly. The original university buildings were then located in what was known as the Valley Campus. It was located geographically down the hill in lower Mankato. The size and footprint of the Valley Campus could not sustain the space needed to handle the growing student body. The Mankato Teachers College received 12 former Army barracks as a short-term solution. By the late 1950s work began on constructing an entirely new, modern campus atop the river valley bluff. This became the Highland Campus. A new experimental school called the Wilson School was built on the Highland Campus to research and apply new teaching methods for students in grades K-12. The intent of this school was to provide student teachers the opportunity to learn and experiment with new methods in a university environment.

1957–1995: Transition to comprehensive university 
By 1957, the mission of the institution had broadened to comprehensive four-year college education, the state legislature changed the name of the college to Mankato State College. The following years saw additional enrollment growth. By the 1960s the institution had grown so fast and so large that there was a bill created in the State Legislature to designate it the University of Southern Minnesota by state Senator Val Imm and later an amendment to the bill by state Representative Mike McGuire would have renamed it Minnesota State University. These were proposed long before the popular television show Coach aired. It was proposed to be a second and independent state university equal in stature to the University of Minnesota at a time when there was only one research institution. There was significant opposition from the University of Minnesota and from Governor Karl Rolvaag at the time.

In 1975, the college successfully made the case to transition to comprehensive status and was renamed to Mankato State University. This change reflected a further 40% growth in the student body to 12,000 students by 1972. Following this period was a movement toward increasing the number of available programs including science, technology, engineering, health sciences and others. The university became more comprehensive in its programmatic offerings. While the transition to "state university" was being considered, administration also explored the prospect of combining the "Valley Campus" buildings with the "Highland Campus" on recommendation of a consultant hired by the Higher Education Coordinating Commission. Despite some faculty opposition to the merger, Mankato State University received permission to consolidate in May 1977 and completed the consolidation under President Margaret Preska on May 5, 1980. The Valley Campus was eventually sold to a private developer and the Highland Campus grew in size.

1995–present: Minnesota State system, doctoral offerings 
In 1995, the seven state universities were transferred to the newly created Minnesota State Colleges and Universities system by a mandate from the state legislature. Shortly after this, the university was renamed Minnesota State University, Mankato in 1998 in recognition of its significant contribution to the state's higher education system. This name change was also intended to broaden recognition of the university in the Midwest region. Dr. Richard Rush, then the president of the university, had famously stated about the name change that "Our goal is to make this University the other great public university in Minnesota." This marked a significant change in direction in the history of the institution, one that would later be realized as it fought for the authorization of being able to award doctoral degrees. It was during this time that the institution began to refer to itself as Minnesota State.

In 2007, in another major milestone, the university was authorized to begin offering applied doctoral degrees.

Academics

MNSU offers over 130 undergraduate programs of study, 13 preprofessional programs, and over 85 graduate programs. The university provides a comprehensive education, each undergraduate program of study includes general requirements for students to learn mathematics, writing, cultural diversity, speech, information technology and the environment. Minnesota State is among the top-producing master's institutions of Fulbright recipients in the nation, producing 11 student grant awards and 41 Fulbright Scholars.

Each year, over 3,000 students graduate from the university. Around 3,000 bachelor's, 600 master's, 50 specialist, and 10 doctorate degrees are conferred by the Office of the Registrar annually. The campus' Career Development Center reports that 85% of graduates find employment in an area related to their field, and 90% of graduates were employed or continuing their education within 12 months of graduation.

The university is accredited by 26 national and regional accrediting agencies. These include accreditation by the Higher Learning Commission, American Association of University Women, American Board of Engineering and Technology, Association to Advance Collegiate Schools of Business, Commission on Collegiate Nursing Education, and National Council for Accreditation of Teacher Education.

Organization and administration 
The university is organized into seven discipline-specific colleges. Academic programs, schools, and extended learning are divided among them:

Institutes and centers 
Twelve university-wide interdisciplinary centers and institutes work across collegiate lines:

Notable programs 
Minnesota State has a history of creating new programs to meet the demand of new and developing fields. It was the first institution in the United States to offer a Master of Fine Arts degree in Forensics. It also offered one of the first interdisciplinary programs in Urban Studies and Local Government Management.

Notable programs include:

The Aviation and Airport Management program is the only accredited aviation program in the State of Minnesota. Graduates are often hired to work in nearby states as the program also serves the needs of the region. The university has developed national partnerships with Delta Air Lines and Sun Country Airlines that provide on the job training and direct hire before graduation programs for students in the aviation and airport management program.
The master's degree in Experiential Education is the field's oldest graduate program in the United States. This program launched in 1971 in partnership with the Minnesota Outward Bound School.

Undergraduate student profile 
Minnesota State's undergraduate student body includes a large percentage of residential full-time students. It attracts the second-largest number of incoming Minnesota freshmen each year. For 2013–2016, the institution had rolling admissions with an acceptance rate of 65.5%, and the average accepted student ACT score ranged from 20 to 25.

Since the fall of 2012, the university has been the largest university in the Minnesota State system according to the total number of full-year equivalent students (14,443), as St. Cloud State (13,938) has a significantly larger percentage of PSEO and part-time students that causes a headcount to be higher.

Campus

Main Campus 
Minnesota State's main campus contains 30 buildings spread over 303 acres. The campus includes on-campus housing, academic buildings, a main library, a music library, two astronomy observatories, experimental research stations for alternative and renewable energy, a recreation center, an athletics complex, a student center, an administration center and over 50 acres of athletics fields including Blakeslee Stadium. The Minnesota State Mavericks men's and women's hockey teams also use and have administrative space at the Verizon Center and the All Seasons Arena located off campus.

Student housing 
There are five residence communities within Minnesota State, housing up to 2,900 students: McElroy Hall, Crawford Hall, Preska Hall, Julia Sears Hall, and apartment-style Stadium Heights. On-campus housing is optional. There are over a dozen Learning Community programs that range from academic to hobby-based interests.

Satellite campuses

Edina Campus 
This campus is located at 7700 France Ave. S. in Edina, and serves a diverse student body from the southwest Twin Cities metropolitan area. Programs at this campus include 12 undergraduate programs including bachelor's degrees, bachelor's completion programs, undergraduate minors and teaching licensure. The College of Graduate Studies offers 23 graduate programs including master's degrees in accounting, Engineering, Education Leadership and other specialty areas.

Owatonna Campus 
Located on the southwest side of Owatonna, the Owatonna College and University Center was established on 27 acres by the state to meet the needs of college graduates in the Owatonna area. This site is a collaboration of Minnesota State University, Mankato, South Central College, and Riverland Community College to provide lower division liberal arts, career and technical education, and upper division and graduate-level studies in one location. On average 4,000 students attend this location for-credit coursework.

Normandale Partnership Center 
A partnership center was established in 2012 to offer several targeted bachelor's degree in the southwest Twin Cities area at Normandale Community College in Bloomington. Several trial programs originally offered at the Normandale Center such as the Twin Cities Engineering program were expanded to other Minnesota State system community colleges in 2016.

Student life

Mankato is widely considered to be a college town, with 32.1% of the population between the ages of 15 and 24. In 2017, Schools.com ranked Mankato, Minnesota as the second-best college town in the United States.

Student organizations 
There are over 200 academic student groups, intramural sports, leadership and religious organizations, honorary and professional fraternities and sororities, and special interest groups that students can join. There is an active Panhellenic Council and Intrafraternity Council. Active fraternities include Phi Kappa Psi, Sigma Nu, Lambda Chi Alpha, Tau Kappa Epsilon, Sigma Chi, and Phi Delta Theta. Active sororities include Alpha Chi Omega, Gamma Phi Beta, Alpha Sigma Alpha, Sigma Sigma Sigma, and Zeta Phi Beta.

Media

Print 
Founded in 1926, The Reporter is the university's student-run newspaper. The Reporter covers Minnesota State athletics, campus happenings, editorials and thought pieces, as well as state and national news. Weekly editions are released during the fall and spring academic terms. Its office is located within the Centennial Student Union.

Radio 
89.7 KMSU 'The Maverick' is the official radio station of Minnesota State University, Mankato. It was founded in 1963. Its office is located in the Alumni Foundation Center.

Centennial Student Union 
Opened on October 27, 1967, the Centennial Student Union is a 213,000 square foot space that serves as a central campus hub. The CSU is home to many university departments including: Student Activities, Student Government, The Reporter, Counseling Center, Kearney International Center, the Multicultural Center, the Veterans Resource Center, the LGBT Center, Maverick Bullpen, Ostrander Auditorium, and the campus bookstore. The CSU is also home to MavAve, a collection of fast-food establishments including: Starbucks, Taco Bell, Chick-fil-A, and a wide assortment of other options.

Student Activities 
Student Activities at Minnesota State University, Mankato is home to a wide variety of departments including: Registered Student Organizations (RSOs), Community Engagement Office, Greek Life & Off-Campus Housing, and Student Events Team. Student Events Team hosts campus-wide events including homecoming concerts and the annual CSU Haunted House Takeover.

LGBT Center 
Minnesota State University, Mankato is home to the second-oldest LGBT resource center for students in the nation. Originally named the "Alternative Lifestyles Office", the center was founded by Minnesota State alumnus James Chalgren in 1977. Located in the Centennial Student Union, it is an independent office within the university's division of Student Affairs. Minnesota State was voted as one of the top 100 campuses in the nation for LGBT students according to The Advocate.

Student government 
The Student Senate provides leadership and policy action as an advisory council to the student body. It oversees student activity fee allocations, hires a student legal aid, communicates with the university faculty and leadership, provides grade appeals, awards a yearly scholarship, and partners with the Memorial Library to operate a textbook rental/reserve program for commonly requested books.

The Student Government (formerly the Minnesota State Student Association) represents Minnesota State University, Mankato students at the institutional, local, state, and federal governing levels through listening to and voicing the thoughts, ideas, and concerns of all students. It advocates on behalf of university students along with Students United.

Athletics

The Minnesota State Mavericks consists of eight men's and ten women's varsity teams. More than 650 students participate each year in athletics each year for the university. It offers teams in men's and women's hockey and basketball, football, baseball, golf, women's swimming, track, cross country, women's tennis, wrestling, soccer, golf, volleyball, and softball. The men's and women's ice hockey teams both compete in NCAA Division I—the men in the Central Collegiate Hockey Association (CCHA) and the women in the Western Collegiate Hockey Association (WCHA). The men's team had competed in the WCHA through the 2020–21 season, but was one of the seven men's WCHA members that left after that season to reestablish the CCHA, leading to the WCHA disbanding its men's division. Other university athletic teams began competing in the Northern Sun Intercollegiate Conference of NCAA Division II in 2008–09 following the disbandment of the North Central Conference.

The school mascot is Stomper the Maverick, a caricature of a wild steer. He is known for helping to rally the fans and crowds at sporting events through various antics. He can be seen as part of giveaways and other competitions and is often playfully waving to children. The school colors are purple and gold.

Minnesota State athletics teams have placed favorably in national competitions in NCAA Division II athletics in several sports including hockey, football, baseball, women's basketball, men's basketball, men's track & field, wrestling, women's soccer and softball. Since 1993, the Mavericks have captured the most individual national championships out of all sixteen colleges and universities in the Northern Sun Conference. The 2015 season marked the 14th straight year that the Mavericks finished in the top 25 in the country in the national standings, and the seventh time Minnesota State had posted a top-five placing for the Learfield Sports Directors' Cup. It has also won the NSIC US Bank All-Sports Award four times and placed second twice during the last six-year period of the 2008–2015 competition seasons.

The Minnesota State fight song is "The Minnesota State Rouser," also known as the "Maverick Rouser." It is played at all the athletics events as well as other events, along with the school song, "The Minnesota State Hymn". The Minnesota State University Marching Band is called the "Maverick Machine," and drives enthusiasm and school spirit at athletics events.

Minnesota State hosted the Minnesota Vikings summer training camp from 1966 to 2017. Each year over 60,000 fans traveled to Blakeslee Stadium to watch the team practice, attend signing events and meet and greets, followed by a fireworks show. In 2017, the Vikings ownership announced they would move the annual tradition to Eagan, Minnesota, following the construction of a new facility. The Vikings have since established a scholarship for Minnesota State students.

Facility renovations and upgrades
The Taylor Center opened in the fall of 2000, and was made possible by the donations of alumnus Glen Taylor. The 4,800-seat facility houses Maverick basketball, volleyball and wrestling teams. The MNSU Admissions office is also located here, and the 5,000 square-foot Hall of Champions showcases the university's history. In addition to Minnesota State Mavericks events, Taylor Center hosts commencement ceremonies, concerts and lectures.

In 2008, expanded outdoor athletic facilities were constructed in the southern portion of the campus. These additions included over 20 acres of baseball fields, a soccer field, a jogging track, walking trail, and experimental wind power facilities.

Notable people

Arts and entertainment 

 Adrienne Armstrong – record producer, clothing designer, and wife of Billie Joe Armstrong of the band Green Day
 Barbara Fister – author, blogger and librarian
 Becca Kufrin – winner of the twenty-second season of The Bachelor and the lead on the fourteenth season of The Bachelorette
 Melissa Peterman – actress, Reba
 Cedric Yarbrough – actor, Reno 911! and The Boondocks

Athletics 

 David Backes – professional and Olympic hockey player
 Adrian Battles – professional football player
 Jerilyn Britz – professional golfer, Minnesota State Mavericks Athletics Hall of Fame
 LaMark Brown – professional football player
 Ryan Carter – professional hockey player
 Jim Dilling – high jumper, 2007 USA Outdoor Champion
 Brandon Girtz – 2007 NCAA All-American wrestler, mixed martial artist
 Tim Jackman – professional hockey player
 Jon Kalinski – professional hockey player
 Connor Mackey – professional hockey player
 Malavath Poorna –  Indian mountaineer, youngest Indian and youngest female to scale Mount Everest
 Travis Morin – professional hockey player and American Hockey League MVP
 Brad Nessler – sports commentator, ESPN/ESPN on ABC
 Zach Palmquist – professional hockey player
 Chris Reed – professional football player
 Grant Stevenson – professional hockey player
 Adam Thielen – professional football player
 Steven Wagner – professional hockey player
 Abdullah Moin - professional cricket player

Business and leadership 

 Maha Abouelenein – communications consultant
 Albert T. Annexstad - former CEO, Federated Mutual; philanthropist
 Lou Bellamy – founder of Penumbra Theatre Company
 Glen Taylor – founder, Taylor Corporation; owner, Minnesota Timberwolves and Minnesota Lynx

Law, politics, government, and military 

 Bob Barrett – member of the Minnesota House of Representatives; Director of Market Research for the Hazelden Foundation
 Bob Bird – Alaskan politician and organizer
 David Bly – member of the Minnesota House of Representatives
 Theresa Greenfield – candidate for 2020 U.S. Senate in Iowa
 Lt. Gen. Dennis Hejlik (USMC) – commanding general of Fleet Marine Force, Atlantic, and Marine Forces Command
 David M. Jennings – former Speaker of the House, Minnesota House of Representatives
 Christian Rosenmeier – Minnesota Senator
 Gary J. Schmidt – Assemblyman, Wisconsin State Assembly
 Stephanie Schriock – former president, Emily's List; former campaign manager for Senator Al Franken (D-MN)
 Steve Strachan – former Member of the Minnesota House of Representatives, former Sheriff of King County, Washington
 Arthur S. Thomas – Chief of Chaplains of the U.S. Air Force
 Tim Walz – 41st governor of Minnesota
 Andy Welti – Representative, Minnesota House of Representatives

Notable faculty 

 Julia Sears – academic, suffragist, first woman to head a public college in the United States

See also

 List of colleges and universities in Minnesota

Notes

References

External links 

 
 Minnesota State Athletics website

 
Public universities and colleges in Minnesota
Education in Blue Earth County, Minnesota
Education in Le Sueur County, Minnesota
Education in Nicollet County, Minnesota
Buildings and structures in Blue Earth County, Minnesota
Mankato, Minnesota
Educational institutions established in 1867
1867 establishments in Minnesota